Ebrahim Remaid Al-Zofairi (born 8 May 1989) is a Kuwaiti middle-distance runner who competes primarily in the 800 metres. He won a gold medal at the 2017 Asian Championships.

International competitions

Personal bests

Outdoor
400 metres – 47.68 (Doha 2014)
800 metres – 1:46.29 (London 2017)
Indoor
800 metres – 1:50.86 (Hangzhou 2014)

References

1989 births
Living people
Kuwaiti male middle-distance runners
World Athletics Championships athletes for Kuwait